TDCS may refer to:

Transcranial direct-current stimulation
Tennessee Department of Children's Services